Technology, Education, Management, Informatics (TEM) is a quarterly peer-reviewed academic journal covering technology and business. The journal has a significant impact as evidenced by citations in Google Scholar. It is indexed by Scopus, Web of Science, and other citation indices.

Publication 
TEM is published by UIKTEN – Association for Information Communication Technology Education and Science, Serbia. It is open access, and does not require a subscription or registration. All previous issues are accessible online.

References

External links 

Quarterly journals
Open access journals
Publications established in 2012
Academic journals published by learned and professional societies
Academic journals published by non-profit organizations
English-language journals